The Ajora falls is a waterfall spectacularly located in Boloso Bombe woreda of Wolaita Zone, bordering Kembata Tembaro Zone in the north, locally known as Haddaro mola kebele, in the south, in the locality of Ajora Kebele, Tiyona gore in the east and in the west with Dawro. The twin waterfall and wildlife as well as different bird species with dense forest makes the area aesthetically attractive.

Ajora cliff is located between Sokei River which flows from Tambaro and Ajecho River in Wolaita. There is about 1.65 km distance between those rivers. The plain made after the waterfall, goes up to the border of Dawro zone. This vast area is covered by dense forest and is home to various wild animals.

Transport access
Access to transport system to reach the destination is available, and possible by car, air plane, bicycle, etc.

Depth of the Ajora Falls

In Wolaita language Ajora means deep, hence the place was named because of the twin waterfalls found in this area. The first Ajora fall has  length and  width and it is named Ajecho. The twin waterfalls join at a place called “Buqula” and flow to Omo valley.

References

Waterfalls of Ethiopia
Wolayita
Tourist attractions in Ethiopia